She Lyin' is the second studio album by American blues singer Skip James, recorded in 1964 and released in 1993. It was originally recorded for Takoma Records and was James' first recording since his rediscovery in 1964.

History
After an early career of performing and recording for the Paramount label in the 1930s, James recorded nothing and drifted in and out of music, virtually unknown. In 1964, blues enthusiasts John Fahey, Bill Barth and Henry Vestine found him in a hospital in Tunica, Mississippi. The "rediscovery" of both James and of Son House at virtually the same moment was the start of the "blues revival" in America.

Fahey and his partner in Takoma Records, ED Denson, signed James to a recording contract. Along with Barth, they arranged for sessions with sound engineer Gene Rosenthal in Rosethal's basement studio in Silver Spring, Maryland. Due to legal issues concerning the rights to the songs, the recording was not released by Takoma and in 1971 Fahey sold the record to Rosenthal.

The studio sessions are supplemented in this release with live performance recordings made by Rosenthal at the Ontario Place Coffee House in Washington, D.C. during the same period.

Although James was not initially covered as frequently as other rediscovered musicians, the British rock band, Cream's version of "I'm So Glad" provided him the only windfall of his career. Cream based their version on James's simplified 1960s recording, instead of the faster, more intricate 1931 original. Deep Purple covered "I'm So Glad" on their first album, Shades of Deep Purple.

Reception
{{Album ratings
| rev1 = AllMusic
| rev1Score = <ref name="AM">{{cite web |first=Ron |last= Wynn  |title= ''She Lyin > Review |url=  |publisher=AllMusic |access-date= February 7, 2011}}</ref>
| rev2 = Robert Christgau
| rev2Score = A− 
|rev3 = The Penguin Guide to Blues Recordings
|rev3score = 
}}
In his review for AllMusic, Ron Wynn called the newly re-discovered James "still capable of playing entrancing, dynamic music, but was much less consistent and not as striking a vocalist" and the release in general "just as solid as the albums James recorded for Columbia during the same period."

Track listing
All songs written by Skip James except as noted.
 "All Night Long" – 1:20
 "Broke and Hungry" – 1:46
 "I'm So Glad" –  2:54
 "Bad Whiskey" – 1:32
 "Cypress Grove Blues" (James, Henry Thomas) –  4:02
 "Catfish Blues" – 5:02
 "Goin' Away to Stay" – 2:26
 "Crow Jane" – 2:05
 "Devil Got My Woman" – 3:09
 "She Lyin'" – 1:12
 "Hard Time Killin' Floor Blues" – 2:16
 "Drunken Spree" – 3:32
 "Black Gal" – 3:15
 "Illinois Blues" – 3:00
 "Worried Blues" – 3:27
 "Look Down the Road" – 2:57

Personnel
Skip James – vocals, guitar, pianoProduction notes:'''
John Fahey – producer
Bill Barth – producer
ED Denson – producer
Gene Rosenthal – producer, compilation producer, engineer, mixing, digital editing, photography
George Mitchell – digital editing
Dan Doyle – compilation producer
Dick Bangham – art direction, design
Linda Gibbon – artwork, graphic design
Jim Marshall – photography
Richard K. Spottswood – liner notes
Larry Hoffman – liner notes

References

1993 albums
Skip James albums
Albums produced by John Fahey (musician)